JOT (also known as JOT the Dot) is an American animated children's television program that ran from  1965 to 1974, and 1980 to 1981. The series consisted of 30 four-minute episodes, which were syndicated between 1965 and the 1980s. JOT was executive produced by the Southern Baptist Radio and Television Commission (RATC) as a Baptist version of Davey and Goliath.

History 
Not only the first Christian animated series, but presumably the first preschool-aimed animated television series, it was created by Ruth Byers, a graduate of Baylor University, and Ted Perry a writer at the RATC. Both had a background connected to the Dallas Theater Center, with Byers having been director of children's productions. The pair was commissioned by Dr. Paul Stevens, president of the RATC, to develop a television show that would provide simple moral lessons for young children. Keitz & Herndon, an American television production company worked on JOT, alongside animator Tom Young. Production of the first episodes began in 1959, with the first episode released in 1965. The style of the show was kept deliberately simple, both as a cost-cutting measure (the budget for the early episodes was never more than $25,000, and that amount dropped over time), and to prevent the design from interfering with the delivery of the message.

The main character, JOT, is a white circle with simple facial features (similar to a smiley face), hands and feet. JOT's color and shape would change in response to the struggles presented. This was meant to represent changes in a child's temperament or emotional state, "somewhat like a thermostat," according to one critic.  His hands and feet are only seen when he is still; when he is in motion, they disappear. Jot does not have a nose. Jot would sometimes be accompanied by Tug (voiced by Ed Ruth), a "bad" character who would learn a moral lesson in the end.

The voice of JOT was provided by two different women, Lou Kelly (1965–1967, 1968, and 1981), and Colleen Collins (1967).

The series premiered on Peppermint Place, a Sunday children's show produced locally at WFAA-TV in Dallas, and later on The Children's Hour on WBAP-TV (now KXAS-TV) in Fort Worth. The episodes were eventually syndicated throughout the world, translated into 19 different languages. They were also a favorite of Sunday School programs. The response to the program was a volume of over 175,000 letters from children, requiring a volunteer group from 22 churches to write responses. The series remained in regular production until 1974. Additional episodes were produced for the 1980 to 1981 season.

JOT the Dot later was owned by FamilyNet Television and was utilized as the network's mascot for its "Families on FamilyNet" programming block until 2014. The JOT animation was updated for new television spots and Web promotions, and the original cartoon shorts were formerly available at the Familynet website.

Legacy and reception
It was also broadcast in other countries, like Chile, as part of an Evangelical television program named “Puertas abiertas” from channel TVN, localised as “Puntito”.

The series was parodied in the Animaniacs (2020) season 2 episode "The Warner's Vault".

In Children's Television: The First Thirty-Five Years, George W. Woolery writes, "The abstract messages captivated and inspired children far beyond anticipation, requiring a volunteer group from twenty-two churches to answer the 175,000 letters that the films prompted."

References

External links
Official FamilyNet Television

JOT the Dot at the Christian Film Database
Short bio of Ruth Byers
JOT the Dot at CEGAnMo.com
JOT episodes at Texas Archive of the Moving Image

1965 American television series debuts
1974 American television series endings
Christian animation
Christian children's television series
1960s American animated television series
1970s American animated television series
American children's animated education television series
First-run syndicated television programs in the United States